Angad Vir Singh Bajwa (born 29 November 1995) is an Indian sport shooter who competes in the skeet discipline. He holds the skeet final round world record of 60 out of 60.

Career
At the 2015 Asian Shooting Championships in Kuwait City, the trio of Bajwa, Anant Naruka and Arjun Mann won the gold medal in the men's skeet junior team event. Bajwa also won gold in the junior individual event.

Bajwa participated in the 2018 Asian Games in Jakarta where he shot 119 out of 125 and failed to qualify for the final. He won the gold medal at the 2018 Asian Shotgun Championships in Kuwait City by shooting a world record 60 in the final round of the men's skeet competition. This was India's first ever gold medal in the skeet discipline in a continental or world-level tournament.

Making a comeback after an illness, Bajwa won the bronze medal at the 2019 Summer Universiade in Naples. At the 2019 Asian Shooting Championships, he won gold in the men's skeet event after a shoot-off with fellow Indian Mairaj Ahmad Khan, who settled for silver. As a result of this, both Bajwa and Khan bagged 2020 Summer Olympics quota places for India. Bajwa also won silver in the mixed team event, with Ganemat Sekhon, in the same competition.

At the 2021 ISSF World Cup in New Delhi, Bajwa won the gold medal in men's skeet team event with Mairaj Ahmad Khan and Gurjoat Siingh Khangura.

Bajwa finished 18th in men's skeet event at the 2020 Summer Olympics with a score of 120/125.

Personal life
Angad started his schooling in Sherwood College, Nainital.
As of 2018, Bajwa is pursuing a BBA from the Manav Rachna University. He studied in Canada for some time while representing Canada in shooting competitions, before returning to India in 2015. His father Gurpal Singh Bajwa owns a hospitality business in Canada.

References

External links
 

Living people
1995 births
Indian male sport shooters
Sport shooters from Punjab, India
Skeet shooters
Shooters at the 2018 Asian Games
Universiade medalists for India
Universiade medalists in shooting
Competitors at the 2019 Summer Universiade
Shooters at the 2020 Summer Olympics
Olympic shooters of India